Talui is a town in Ukhrul district, Manipur state, India. According to 2011 census, Talui has 820 households with the total population of 4296 of which 2232 were male and 2064 female.

Notes

References

Cities and towns in Ukhrul district